French School in Zagreb ( EFZ) is a French international school in the EuroCampus in Zagreb, Croatia. The school opened in 1996 and started classes at the EuroCampus, which also houses the Deutsche Internationale Schule in Zagreb, on September 1, 2005.

The school directly teaches primaire (primary) and collège (junior high school) levels. Lycée (senior high school/sixth form) students take classes by the National Centre for Distance Education (CNED) distance education service.

References

External links

  French School in Zagreb
  French School in Zagreb
Old website, English page

1996 establishments in Croatia
Educational institutions established in 1996
French international schools in Europe
International schools in Croatia
Buildings and structures in Zagreb